RocDaMic is Nigeria's first hiphop and alternative music reality television show. It is being shot and produced in Nigeria by Abuja-based television content firm, Zara Productions. It was borne out of the need to create a platform for the thousands of Nigerian youth who have the talent and passion for hip-hop and Nigerian music but who have been denied the opportunity to showcase their talent in other competitions.

History
The show is hosted by the show's producer, Sara Williams-Konha and the panel of judges consists of veteran rapper/producer, Fr3Style, producer and DJ, DJ Klem, and on-air personality Tyeng Gang. For most of the audition venues, a resident judge has joined the other judges. For Port Harcourt, indigenous rapper, Double K came on board. At Benin and Lagos, popular OAPs Sydney Shocker and El Boogie took their place as part of the jury while Eastern rapper, Slow Dogg filled up for the Enugu auditions.

Auditions were open for every Nigerian, irrespective of age, in five different cities across the country, namely Abuja, Benin, Enugu, Lagos and Port Harcourt. The first season will go on air in December 2011 and is shown on different channels all across Africa. A total of 23 contestants were so selected for "Da Roc" as the show's final location is called.

Selection process
In a series of steps, the show selects the eventual winner out of many tens of thousands of contestants.

The eligible age-range for contestants is 13–35 years old. The contestants must be legal Nigerian residents.

Following several different tests, tasks and scheduled performances, contestants will be critiqued by a panel of judges based on competence, content and marketability. Eventually, viewers of the show will be allowed to vote to keep their favorite artists on the show.

Prizes 
For the first season, prizes include four million naira, a brand new car and an international recording contract for the winner; two million naira and a local recording contract for the first runner-up; and one million naira with loads of consolation prizes for the second runner-up.

References

External links 
 Official Site

Nigerian reality television series
Nigerian hip hop
Africa Independent Television original programming
HiTV original programming